The Sunday Times Rich List 2013 is the 25th annual survey of the wealthiest people resident in the United Kingdom, published by The Sunday Times on 21 April 2013.

The Guardian noted that "the annual rich list is dominated by Russian and Indian billionaires, with the highest ranking Briton being the Duke of Westminster, worth £7.8bn thanks to his property holdings in London's Mayfair and Belgravia and ranked eighth."

Top 10 fortunes

See also 
 Forbes list of billionaires

References

External links 
 Sunday Times Rich List

Sunday Times Rich List
2013 in the United Kingdom